The 1905 Washington & Jefferson Red and Black football team represented Washington & Jefferson College during the 1905 college football season. The team compiled a 10–3 record. Frank Piekarski was the team's coach.

Schedule

References

Washington and Jefferson
Washington & Jefferson Presidents football seasons
Washington and Jefferson Red and Black football